Shrek is a 2001 platform video game developed by Sandbox Studios and published by TDK Mediactive for the Xbox, based on the 2001 film Shrek. The game was released on November 15, 2001 as one of 22 North American launch titles for the Xbox and March 28, 2002 in Europe. A reworked version of the game, titled Shrek: Extra Large, was released for the GameCube on October 30, 2002 in North America and on October 24, 2003 in Europe. Shrek: Extra Large uses the same engine and game mechanics as the original Xbox release, but with an altered story and different levels. The game was noted for being one of the first commercial titles to make use of deferred shading.

Shrek received generally unfavorable reviews upon release, with criticism being directed at its gameplay and audio.

Gameplay
The player completes objectives named "Good Deeds". In most objectives, the player hunts for an object and completes an action. Not many objectives vary from this, though a few will occasionally vary.

Plot
Following a completely different narrative than that of the eponymous film which it is based on, Shrek is meant to be a "continuation" of the story of the film, taking place after the title character has set out to regain his swamp and become a "'de facto' hero" to the fairy tale creatures. Shrek is delivered a message by the infamous Magic Mirror that his wife Princess Fiona has been captured by an evil wizard, Merlin. Shrek must travel to Merlin's Dark Tower Fortress of Pure Evil, but an impassable fog has been laid across the Fairy Tale Lands. The fog and Merlin's Fortress can be passed through the completion of Good Deeds. The Magic Mirror gives Shrek a Book of Good Deeds and offers to teleport him to places where Good Deeds are required.

Development 
On December 20, 2000, TDK Mediactive signed a five-year deal with DreamWorks to produce video games based on the Shrek license; the plan upon signing was to release a Game Boy title coinciding with the film's release and issue another game for "a next generation platform" in the fourth quarter of 2001. On February 6, 2001, the next-generation console was announced to be Xbox, development duties would go towards Sandbox Studios, and the game would use character and object models from the original movie. On May 16, 2001, IGN released nine clips of gameplay footage from the Xbox title, noting "details in the graphics including loads of bump mapping an per pixel shading."
During development, Sandbox Studios was acquired by EA DICE (prior to their acquisition by Electronic Arts) and renamed to Digital Illusions Canada.

A port of Extra Large for the PlayStation 2 was planned for release in 2003, but was cancelled due to TDK Mediactive being acquired by Take-Two Interactive later that year, as a result losing the rights for Shrek games.

Reception

Both Shrek and Extra Large received "generally unfavorable reviews" according to the review aggregation website Metacritic. Reviewers criticized the gameplay in particular, as well as the audio. IGN described Extra Larges puzzles as "run of the mill" and complained of the lack of audio in certain sections of the game. X-Play criticized Extra Larges framerate, "jerky" animation, and camera control claiming it could make some players nauseous. Critics generally praised the game's graphical presentation, with X-Plays Skyler Miller saying the game's graphics were "impressive at a standstill" and Raymond Padilla of GameSpy claiming the in-game graphics matched the movie's visuals. Extra Larges visuals were less favorably received, with IGN critiquing the game's lack of bump mapping when transitioned over to the GameCube as well as the poor animation. NextGen said of the Xbox version, "This young-skewing platform adventure is kept from greatness by a few small things – namely, bland, broken gameplay; an uncannily counterintruitive camera; unfocused, comically haphazard level design and goals; and ho-hum sound. Simply put, this game sucks."

On December 11, 2001, TDK Mediactive CFO Martin Paravato reported sales for both Fairy Tale Freakdown and the Xbox version making up "a significant portion of our revenue." Shrek was the ninth-highest selling Xbox for the month of November 2001, selling 45,900 units and making up 2.6% of the console's revenue.

As of October 2002, total units of all of TDK's Shrek games released at the time, including the Game Boy Color, Xbox, and GameCube games as well as Hassle at the Castle (2002), totaled over 1.2 million units in sales.

References

External links

2001 video games
Digital Illusions CE games
GameCube games
Platform games
Shrek video games
3D platform games
Video games developed in Sweden
Xbox games
Cancelled PlayStation 2 games
Single-player video games
TDK Mediactive games